Besir Iseni (born 2 May 2000) is a Macedonian professional footballer of Albanian descent who plays as a centre back for Tirana in the Kategoria Superiore.

References

Honours

Club 
Tirana
Albanian Supercup: 2022

External links

2000 births
Living people
Footballers from Skopje
Albanian footballers from North Macedonia
Association football central defenders
Macedonian footballers
North Macedonia under-21 international footballers
FC Struga players
KF Tirana players
Macedonian First Football League players
Kategoria Superiore players
Macedonian expatriate footballers
Expatriate footballers in Albania
Macedonian expatriate sportspeople in Albania